Porfirio de León (born 13 November 1956) is a Puerto Rican weightlifter. He competed in the men's flyweight event at the 1976 Summer Olympics.

References

1956 births
Living people
Puerto Rican male weightlifters
Olympic weightlifters of Puerto Rico
Weightlifters at the 1976 Summer Olympics
Place of birth missing (living people)
Pan American Games medalists in weightlifting
Pan American Games bronze medalists for Puerto Rico
Weightlifters at the 1983 Pan American Games
20th-century Puerto Rican people
21st-century Puerto Rican people